Vision of Disorder is an American hardcore/metalcore band from Long Island, New York, that initially released three albums before disbanding in 2002. The band garnered attention for blending melody and groove into a traditional hardcore framework, but its attempts to pursue an alternative metal direction on its third album were met with limited commercial success. The band reunited in 2008 and have since released two further albums, The Cursed Remain Cursed in 2012 and Razed to the Ground in 2015.

History
Guitarists Matt Baumbach and Mike Kennedy formed the band in 1992 with vocalist/lyricist Tim Williams, drummer Brendon Cohen, and bassist Mike Fleischmann. Vision of Disorder released a series of demos and contributed to several compilations before releasing the Still EP in 1995 on Striving for Togetherness Records. The band appeared in the N.Y.H.C. documentary around the same time. Vision of Disorder gained attention for incorporating different styles into its hardcore framework.

The band signed with Roadrunner Records' subsidiary, Supersoul, and released its self-titled full-length debut in 1996. The band was later praised for its impact upon the popularization of hardcore music: the debut album was "metallic hardcore that no one had heard, released for a mass audience on a big label. It had its merits; powerful, screamed vocals often layered over depressing clean vocals combined with fresh 'un-hardcore' guitar sections and unfamiliar drum patterns. For anyone into hardcore at the time, this was the album to have."

Vision of Disorder's second album, Imprint, was released in 1998 on Roadrunner Records and featured guest vocals by Pantera's Phil Anselmo on the song "By the River". The band was displeased with the raw production quality, which it attributed to the brief window for recording the album. Vision of Disorder also took issue with the purported lack of tour support by its record label. The band and label severed their working relationship acrimoniously, as Williams recalls:

After the label strife, Vision of Disorder kept a relatively low profile. However, they eventually returned in 1999 with For the Bleeders, a set of nine re-recorded demo songs released on Go-Kart Records.

In 2001, Vision of Disorder released From Bliss to Devastation on TVT Records. The album marked a shift towards a traditional verse-chorus-verse songwriting structure. Kennedy described the album as "fitting in with the nu-metal scene" while Williams praised the band's songwriting approach:

Reportedly frustrated by the lack of support from TVT, Vision of Disorder went on extended hiatus and eventually disbanded. Williams and Kennedy formed the band Bloodsimple while Cohen and Fleischmann played in Karvnov.

Vision of Disorder reunited briefly in order to play three songs during a show with Bloodsimple and Karnov. The band played several one-off shows and shot footage for a DVD before formally reuniting in October 2008. Williams described the material for the reunion album as similar to Imprint. While the album was ultimately delayed several times, in July 2011, the first single, "The Enemy", was released on Candlelight Records. On September 18, 2012, The Cursed Remain Cursed was released. The album was celebrated as "largely a return to the confrontational metallic hardcore that gave Imprint its cult following," although "some elements of From Bliss to Devastation...creep in on occasion".

Around this time Matt Baumbach left the band, and former Mind Over Matter and dayinthelife guitarist Josh Demarco took his place in the line-up. VOD's next album was released on November 27, 2015, 'Razed to the Ground', via Candlelight Records (and was produced by Zeuss). AXS contributor Terrance Pryor named the release one of the best metalcore records of 2015, calling it "a definite rager from start to finish".

Band members

Current members
Tim Williams − vocals (1992–2002, 2006, 2008–present)
Mike Kennedy – guitar (1992–2002, 2006, 2008–present)
Mike Fleischmann – bass guitar (1992–2002, 2006, 2008–present)
Brendon Cohen – drums (1992–2002, 2006, 2008–present)
Josh Demarco – guitar (2015–present)

Former members
Matt Baumbach – guitar (1992–2002, 2006, 2008–2013)

Discography

Studio albums

DVD
Dead in NY (Koch Entertainment, 2008)

EPs
Still (Striving for Togetherness Records, 1995)
N.Y.H.C. Documentary Soundtrack (Striving for Togetherness Records, 1996)
Resurrecting Reality (EP) (Crisis/Revelation Records 1998)

Demos
Demo '93
Demo '94 (The "Extra Shit" Demo)
Demo '95

Miscellaneous
Vision of Disorder/Loyal to None split 7-inch (Hearsay Records, 1994)
Vision of Disorder/Loyal to None Live on WUSB Riptide Radio (split cassette, recorded live, 1994)
Vision of Disorder Live on WUSB Riptide Radio (distributed on cassette tape, 1995)
Vision of Disorder/Nanchaku - split 7-inch (Japanese Import) (Dea Records, 1997)
Landslide/Twelve Steps to Nothing - split 7-inch w/ Dive, Uzamaki (Dea Records, 1999)
What You Are/Jada Bloom - split 7-inch w/ Minor League, Wrongside (Dea Records, 1999)

References

External links

Vision of Disorder on Myspace

TVT Records artists
Metalcore musical groups from New York (state)
Musical groups established in 1992
Musical groups from New York City
Musical groups reestablished in 2008
Hardcore punk groups from New York (state)
American nu metal musical groups